Headhunter  or head hunter may refer to:

 Headhunting, hunting a human and collecting the severed head after killing them
 Executive search, informally called headhunting, a specialized recruitment service

Arts and entertainment

Film and television
 Headhunter (2009 film), a Danish thriller
 Headhunters (film), a 2011 Norwegian film 
 Head Hunters (game show), a British TV show from 2019
 "Headhunters" (Gravity Falls), an episode of the animated TV series 
 The Head Hunter, a 1982 Hong Kong action film
 The Head Hunter (2018 film), an American fantasy horror film

Literature
 Headhunter (novel), by Timothy Findley, 1993
 Headhunters (novel), by John Kin, 1997
 Headhunter, a 1984 novel by Michael Slade
 Headhunters (Hodejegerne), a 2008 novel by Jo Nesbø

Music
 The Headhunters, a jazz fusion band founded by Herbie Hancock
 Head Hunters, a 1973 album by Herbie Hancock
 Headhunter (album), by Krokus, 1983, and its title track "Headhunter"
 The Head Hunters, a 1969 album by Chico Hamilton, and the title track "Head Hunters"
 "Headhunter" (song), by Front 242, 1988
 "Head Hunter" (song), by Dance Gavin Dance, 2019
 "Headhunters", a song by 808 State from the 1988 album Newbuild

Other uses in arts and entertainment
 Headhunter (DC Comics), a fictional character
 Headhunter (video game), 2001
 Headhunter Redemption, the 2003 sequel 
 Z-95 Headhunter, a class of starfighter in Star Wars

Businesses, organizations and groups
 Head Hunters Motorcycle Club, in New Zealand
 80th Fighter Squadron, USAF, nicknamed Headhunters
 9th Cavalry Regiment (United States), formerly known as Headhunters in Vietnam
 Headhunter Records, a record label

People
 Jade Jones (taekwondo) (born 1993), British taekwondo fighter nicknamed "The Headhunter"
 Headhunter, three character wrestlers from the Gorgeous Ladies of Wrestling
 Headhunter, a former performing name of electronic music artist Addison Groove (Tony Williams, born 1942)
 Headhunterz (Willem Rebergen, born 1985), Dutch DJ and music producer

Sports
 Headhunter (baseball), a baseball pitcher who aims at a player's head
 The Headhunters (professional wrestling), a professional wrestling tag team of Headhunter A and Headhunter B
 Chelsea Headhunters, a British football hooligan firm
 Mississippi Headhunters, formerly Columbus Wardogs, an American arena football team

See also
 
 
 Hunter (disambiguation)
 Head (disambiguation)
 The Kentucky Headhunters, an American country rock band
 Headhunters of the Coral Sea, a 1940 book by Ion Idriess